J. D. Wiker is a game designer who has worked primarily on role-playing games.

Career
JD Wiker originally comes from Indianapolis, where he began his love of games, starting with his family's collection of board games and the weekly game night. He designed his first game — a mash-up of Stratego and Tank Battle — in 1977, and discovered Dungeons & Dragons while buying miniatures to use as playing pieces. Wiker has done work on Wizards of the Coast's version of the Star Wars Roleplaying Game, including The Dark Side Sourcebook, The Hero's Guide, and The Galactic Campaign Guide. After leaving Wizards in 2002, he founded The Game Mechanics, and is the company's president and lead roleplaying game designer, with credits including Artifacts of the Ages: Swords & Staves and the City Quarters series: Thieves' Quarter, Temple Quarter, and Arcane Quarter.

Wiker lives and works in the San Diego area.

Works
His Dungeons & Dragons work has included design contributions to the third edition Player's Handbook, Monster Manual, and Dungeon Master's Guide (2000), Unearthed Arcana (2004), Planar Handbook (2004), Sandstorm (2005), and Monster Manual IV (2006).

References

External links
 

Dungeons & Dragons game designers
Living people
Year of birth missing (living people)